The men's 4×200 metre freestyle relay event at the 1960 Olympic Games took place August 29 — September 1. The relay featured teams of four swimmers each swimming four lengths of the 50 m pool freestyle.

Medalists

Results

Heats

Two heats were held; the fastest eight teams advanced to the Finals.  The teams that advanced are highlighted.

Heat One

Heat Two

Final

References

Swimming at the 1960 Summer Olympics
4 × 200 metre freestyle relay
Men's events at the 1960 Summer Olympics